Dojejo was an advisory position or Supreme Commissioner in Sogamun (屬衙門; civil and military jurisdiction) of Yukjo (Six Ministries) or in a military camp during the Joseon Dynasty of Korea. Among the jurisdictions of Yukjo in the early period of Joseon, important facilities related to King's power or state or diplomatic affairs had Dojejo participate in advising over major issues such as personnel or administrative affairs. Although the post was appointed to incumbent or retired Uijeong (High State Councillors of Uijeongbu) such as Yeonguijeong or Jwauijeong as a concurrent post, the King's relatives concurrently served the post related to Jongbusi (宗簿寺, Royal Family Management Office) that dealt with the royal court-related activities.

See also
Yeonguijeong
Yukjo
Joseon Dynasty politics
History of Korea

References

Joseon dynasty
Politics of Korea